Wilson Dallam Wallis (March 7, 1886 – March 15, 1970) was an American anthropologist. He is remembered for his studies of "primitive" science and religions.

Wallis was born in Forest Hill, Maryland. He completed an undergraduate degree in philosophy and law at Dickinson College, and in 1907 went up to Wadham College, Oxford as a Rhodes Scholar, studying Edward Burnett Tylor. He received his doctorate from the University of Pennsylvania in 1915.

From 1923 to 1954, he taught at the University of Minnesota. After retiring from Minnesota, he taught for a time at Annhurst College. He died in South Woodstock, Connecticut.

Works
 The Malecite Indians of New Brunswick (Ottawa, 1957)
 The Micmac Indians of Eastern Canada (Minneapolis, 1955)
 Messiahs: Christian and Pagan (Boston, 1918)

References

External links
Wallis collection at the Canadian Museum of History
Dickinson College photograph
Wilson Dallam Wallis collection at the University of Minnesota

1886 births
1970 deaths
People from Harford County, Maryland
Dickinson College alumni
Alumni of Wadham College, Oxford
University of Pennsylvania alumni
University of Minnesota faculty
20th-century American anthropologists